A.E.R. was a French automobile manufacturer and one-time subsidiary of B.N.C.; the marque offered two cars patterned on American models.  One was an sv 1991cc six-cylinder with CIME engine; the other used a Lycoming side valve straight-eight of 4241 cc and Delaunay-Belleville chassis.  Unusually, suspension was by a pneumatic device which soon proved unreliable.  Production ceased after one year of manufacture (1930), but the cars were later reissued under the name Aigle, in models using conventional suspension.

External links
 Enthusiast site for the marque (French)

Defunct motor vehicle manufacturers of France